Vålerenga Fotball is a Norwegian association football club from Oslo and a part of the multi-sport club Vålerengens IF. Founded in 1913, the club is named after the neighbourhood of Vålerenga. Vålerenga's home ground is Intility Arena, located in Valle-Hovin. Vålerenga are five-time league champions and four-time Norwegian Football Cup champions, having last won the league in 2005 and the cup in 2008.

History

Early days (1913–45)
The history of Vålerenga Fotball goes back to Fotballpartiet Spark, which was founded in 1898 by pastor Hans Møller Gasmann. An early mission for Gasmann was to give the local youth social activity and exercise. On a larger scale, the club was part of the movement known as Muscular Christianity. A successor to this football club, Idrettslaget Spring, was founded on 29 July 1913 by a group of teenage factory workers. A year later, the club changed its name to Vaalerengens Idrættsforening. Rooted in the neighborhood of Vålerenga on the east end of Oslo, the club would recruit players and supporters from the many workers in the area, in a society then characterized for its low mobility between social strata. Within its first seasons, Vålerengen would compete with the major clubs in Oslo at that time; Lyn, Mercantile and Frigg. Where Lyn and Frigg had a strong identity with the academia and the upper classes, Vålerengen developed a working class identity.

Vålerengens Idrettsforening had mixed success in its first years, but fortunes improved as the 1920s came around and the club secured promotion to the Oslo Championships in 1921. Vålerengen won the Oslo Championships four times before a national league (Norgesserien) was established in 1937. In the 1948–49 season, Vålerengen finished second.

After this period, Vålerengen entered a period of instability, being relegated from the top division two times in the 1950s.

The Bohemians (1946–68)

The charismatic Helmuth Steffens became a central figure in building up the culture in the club after the war. At the beginning of the 1960s, a new generation of local players broke into Vålerengen's first squad. Players like Einar Bruno Larsen, Terje Hellerud and Leif Eriksen became core personalities of a group of players which eventually became known as Bohemene (The Bohemians). The club would become known for its brilliant style of football as the number of people in the audience increased. The players became popular for their charismatic, witty comments and light hearted humour. Vålerengen secured a third place in 1961.

In 1965, Vålerengen won the First Division for the first time. By the help of manager Helmuth Steffens and head coach Anton Ploderer, the club had managed to win the title with a team of local players. The league was won in dramatic fashion, with arch-rivals Lyn giving Vålerengen a fight for the title until the final matches of the season.

The Bohemian era came to an end when the club was relegated from the First Division in 1968 and then again to the Third Division in 1970. Vålerengen did not achieve promotion to the top league again until 1974. In 1976, Vålerenga signed Odd Iversen, who at the time had 112 First Division goals to his name. Iversen would help the club reestablish itself in the First Division.

The glory years (1977–86)
The 80s saw the emergence of a new generation. With the help of players like Tom Jacobsen and Vidar Davidsen, Vålerengen would win its first cup title in 1980.

Led by head coach Leif Eriksen, the team won the First Division title for the second time in 1981 with a style of play characterized by intensity and discipline. The club was unable to reclaim the league title in 1982, but won it again in 1983 and 1984. During the decade, Vålerengen would also become twice runners-up in the cup and also achieve a third place in the league in 1985. Vålerengen had become a stable top team for the first and, to date, only time.

1985 also saw the signing of striker Jørn Andersen, who would go on to score 23 goals in 22 matches in his sole season for Vålerengen. However, as the club had miscalculated the home crowd average, the club entered severe financial difficulties. Vålerenga was saved from bankruptcy in 1987.

Ups and downs (1987–2003)
In 1990, now known as Vålerenga, the club was relegated after 14 seasons in the top division. Vålerenga was close to further relegation in the 1992 season, but managed to remain in the second highest division thanks to a last round 3–0 win against Eik-Tønsberg IF. In 1994, Vålerenga returned to the top division, but were relegated again in 1996. In 1997 Vålerenga won the cup and the 1. divisjon and were again promoted to Tippeligaen. As earlier in the 1990s, the stay in the top division lasted only a few years.

In the 2000 season Vålerenga lost the play-off matches against Sogndal and was relegated to the 1. divisjon. Vålerenga returned to Tippeligaen and won the cup in 2002.

The 2003 season was poor for Vålerenga and they wound up third last in the league sending them into play-offs against Sandefjord to avoid relegation. The result was a 0–0 draw in Sandefjord and a 5–3 victory in Oslo and so Vålerenga retained the position in the top league and avoided relegation.

Success, disappointments and troubles (2004–12)
Vålerenga rebounded nicely in the 2004 season and proved a serious challenge to the dominant Rosenborg team in the bid for the league's gold medal. After a frantic final round where Vålerenga beat Stabæk 3–0, they missed out on the league title since Rosenborg beat FK Lyn, Vålerenga's city rivals 4–1. Vålerenga won the silver medal, finishing 2nd to Rosenborg equal on points and goal difference, but Vålerenga had scored fewer goals than Rosenborg during the season, leaving Rosenborg as league champions.

At the start of the 2005 season it was apparent that Rosenborg was in bad shape and it seemed like Vålerenga's season to go all the way. After a strong season opening, the surprise of the season IK Start – newly promoted to the Tippeligaen – looked to give Vålerenga a fight to the finish, and the two clubs basically alternated on leading the series to the final round. On 29 October it looked to be a thrilling last round reminiscent of the previous year, as both Start and Vålerenga had exactly the same number of points, but Start with a slightly better goal difference. Start met Fredrikstad FK at home, while Vålerenga met Odd Grenland away. Eventually Fredrikstad, who faced relegation if they lost, beat Start 3–1 while at the same time Vålerenga managed a 2–2 draw against Odd Grenland. Vålerenga stepped one up from the previous year, and won the title with a one-point margin. The title was Vålerenga's first league title in 21 years, ending Rosenborg's 13-year reign as league champions.

The follow-up season of 2006 did not start out as well for the reigning champions, and a poor start left them at the bottom of the table after seven rounds, having gained only 5 points. A steady rise in form though still brought the team to 6th place by the time the season was half-through. Late July brought a string of bad results, including embarrassing losses to main rival FK Lyn, and the exit from the UEFA Champions League, after losing 5–3 on aggregate to Czech club Mladá Boleslav in the 2nd qualifying round. Vålerenga had aimed to qualify for the tournament after missing out the previous year by being defeated by Belgian side Club Brugge on a penalty shoot-out. After losing five out of seven games between 22 July and 19 August head-coach Kjetil Rekdal announced his resignation. Assistant coach Petter Myhre took over as interim manager, and as a result the club regained their form and scored 25 out of the last 30 possible points, bringing the club to a third place in the league, as well as a qualification spot for the 2007–08 Europa League. Vålerenga also qualified for play in the 2006–07 Scandinavian Royal League after finishing among the top four teams in Norway. In October 2006, Petter Myhre was hired on a permanent basis, but he would resign in July 2007, following a string of bad results.

In November 2007, Martin Andresen signed a three-year contract to become the next manager of Vålerenga. Heavy investment from owners and investors saw the signing of several high-profile players, most notably Lars Iver Strand and Kristoffer Hæstad. However, despite winning the 2008 Norwegian Football Cup, the following season was a disappointment, with Vålerenga finishing 10th in the league. In the 2009 season, Vålerenga finished 7th, reaching the semifinal in the cup. 2010 saw a revitalized Vålerenga, led by a trio of effective forwards, Mohammed Abdellaoue, Bengt Sæternes and Luton Shelton. Vålerenga finished second in the league.

However, Vålerenga could not repeat the success in 2011 and 2012. In October 2012, Andresen and Vålerenga agreed to part ways.

A new era (2013–present)
Kjetil Rekdal returned to the club as head coach in January 2013. Facing economic difficulties from previous seasons and being without a shirt sponsorship deal, Vålerenga spent much of the 2014 season dealing with a severe risk of bankruptcy, finally signing a new shirt sponsorship deal with DnB on 29 July. The signing of striker Vidar Örn Kjartansson in front of 2014 season proved to be a huge success, with the Icelandic player scoring 25 goals in 29 games, helping the Oslo club secure a sixth place in the league after a drop in form in the latter half of the season.

On 13 July 2016, Ronny Deila was appointed as the new head coach. Deila was originally planned to take over in January 2017, but was involved in the coaching team for the final games of the 2016 season. Kjetil Rekdal was to become director of sports, but left the club in early 2017. In December 2019, Ronny Deila left to become the coach of New York City Football Club. In January 2020, Dag-Eilev Fagermo became the new head coach.

Vålerenga moved into their newly built stadium, Intility Arena, in September 2017. This was a historic move for the club, after spending 104 years without owning a home stadium. The new stadium is also close to Vålerenga neighborhood of Oslo.

Colours
Up to 1913, Vålerenga's kit was moss green. In 1914, the Norwegian State Railways had a set of blue and red kits left over, which Vålerenga bought cheaply, so their official colours became blue and red. The 2006 season away kit was white with a touch of moss green.

Stadium

In 2017, Vålerenga opened their own home ground at Valle Hovin in Eastern Oslo, called Intility Arena. The stadium has a capacity of 17,333 on domestic games (15,389 on international games), and the playing surface is artificial grass. The very first match in the ground saw the Vålerenga women's team beat Kolbotn Fotball 2–0 on 9 September 2017, with Stephanie Verdoia being the first ever goalscorer on the Arena. The next day, the men's team lost 2–1 to Sarpsborg 08 in their first game at the stadium. The ground was first called Vålerenga kultur- og idrettspark, before the club agreed a contract with the IT company Intility to rename the stadium.

The construction of the new arena
Following a press statement made on 15 May 2008, Vålerenga announced that they would be moving home to Valle Hovin after purchasing the area of the proposed stadium for the symbolic sum of 1 Norwegian Krone. In late 2014, the plans were accepted by the city council of Oslo. On 10 June 2014, the European Free Trade Association Surveillance Authority accepted the plans for the stadium.

The foundation stone of the new stadium was laid on 29 July 2015, the club's 102nd anniversary. Construction was begun in the summer of 2015 and is planned to be completed in 2017.

Stadium history
Before moving into Intility Arena, the Ullevaal Stadion was the home ground, a stadium owned jointly by the Football Association of Norway and Vital Eiendom.

From the 1960s till the 1980s and a short period in the end of the 1990s Bislett Stadium was Vålerenga's home ground. Bislett Stadium also hosted speed skating and track and field events in addition to football, and hosted the 1952 Winter Olympics. Poor conditions and maintenance of Bislett forced Vålerenga to move to Ullevaal and a groundshare with FK Lyn.

After Vålerenga moved from Bislett Stadium plans for building their own ground were conceived, but poor results on the field combined with financial problems kept those plans at bay for a few years. After the second place in 2004 and the league title in 2005 as well as business man John Fredriksen's deletion of the club's debt in 2003, the talks of building a ground for Vålerenga resurfaced.

Supporters

Vålerenga has traditionally drawn support from the area around Vålerenga, Oslo and various other places on the east end of Oslo, although today these lines are largely blurred and the club has supporters all over Oslo and the surrounding areas. Up until the early 90s, Vålerenga's supporters were loosely organised. The supporters were sometimes referred to as Apeberget, but this is actually a misnomer from a journalist. An independent supporter club called Klanen ("The Clan") was founded in 1991. It has around 10,000 members today. The senior team of Vålerenga has reserved shirt number 12 for their supporters. Vålerenga's supporters, and specifically Klanen, are widely considered to be the best football supporters in Norway.

Rivalries

Vålerenga's main rivals include Lillestrøm, Ham Kam, Kongsvinger, Brann and Lyn. Since the 90s, the main supporter club has actively worked hard for social issues and against hooliganism. Despite this, as recently as 2019, isolated individuals within the club's support have engaged in disruptive and dangerous activities during live matches.

In the 2014 season, Vålerenga gathered an average attendance of 9,756 at their home matches, ranking them fourth in Norway with regard to attendance.

Honours
 Eliteserien:
 Winners (5): 1965, 1981, 1983, 1984, 2005
 Runners-up (3): 1948–49, 2004, 2010
 Norwegian Cup:
 Winners (4): 1980, 1997, 2002, 2008
 Runners-up (2): 1983, 1985
 Superfinalen:
 Runners-up (1): 2009

Recent seasons

Source:

European record

Summary

Source: uefa.com, Last updated on 29 July 2021Pld = Matches played; W = Matches won; D = Matches drawn; L = Matches lost; GF = Goals for; GA = Goals against. Defunct competitions indicated in italics.Notes: This summary includes matches played in the Inter-Cities Fairs Cup, which was not endorsed by UEFA and is not counted in UEFA's official European statistics.

List of matches

Records
 Largest victory in the top division: 8–0 vs. Lisleby, 1951
 Longest consecutive seasons in the top division: 17 seasons (2002–present)
 Most top division matches since 1963:  Morten Berre, 281 matches (2003–14)
 Most goals in mandatory matches:  Einar Bruno Larsen, 99 goals (1957–68)
 Most goals in a single season:  Viðar Örn Kjartansson, 25 goals in 29 matches (2014)
 Record attendance: Ullevaal Stadion, 23 October 2005. The 2005 season's last home game, against Rosenborg, 24894 spectators
 Biggest win in a European cup match: 6–0 vs.  Ekranas, 30 August 2007 (7–1 overall)

(numbers as of 3 September 2007)

Players and staff

First-team squad

Notable past players and staff

  Aki Riihilahti
  Allan Kierstein Jepsen
  Arni Gautur Arason
  Bjørn Arild Levernes
  Bojan Zajic
  Christian Grindheim
  Daniel Fredheim Holm
  David Brocken
  Deshorn Brown
  Einar Bruno Larsen
  Egil Olsen
  Erik Hagen
  Fegor Ogude
  Freddy dos Santos
  Giancarlo Gonzalez
  Ghayas Zahid
  Gunder Bengtsson
  Henning Berg
  Henry Johansen
  John Carew
  Jørn Andersen
  Kjell Roar Kaasa
  Kjetil Rekdal
  Kjetil Wæhler
  Kristofer Hæstad
  Lars Bohinen
  Lars Hirschfeld
  Luton Shelton
  Martin Andresen
  Mohammed Abdellaoue
  Mohammed Fellah
  Morten Berre
  Nils Arne Eggen
  Odd Iversen
  Pa-Modou Kah
  Pascal Simpson
  Ronny Deila
  Ronny Johnsen
  Sam Adekugbe
  Steffen Iversen
  Thomas Holm
  Tobias Grahn
  Tom Henning Hovi
  Tore Krogstad
  Troy Perkins
  Tore Andre Flo
  Vidar Davidsen
  Vidar Orn Kjartansson

Retired and reserved numbers
Number 12 is reserved for the fans (often referred to as the 12th man)

Coaching staff

Managers

 Henry "Tippen" Johansen (1944)
 Kristian "Svarten" Henriksen (1947–48)
 Henry "Tippen" Johansen (1949)
 Willibald Hahn (1955)
 Kristian "Svarten" Henriksen (1957–58)
 Knut "Bossen" Osnes (1962)
 Joar Hoff (1978)
 Gunder Bengtsson (1983), (1984)
 Olle Nordin (1985)
 Svein Ivar Sigernes (1987–88)
 Olle Nordin (1 Jan 1990 – Dec 31, 1992)
 Vidar Davidsen (1 Jan 1993 – Dec 31, 1997)
 Lars Tjærnås (1 Jan 1998 – Aug 6, 1998)
 Egil "Drillo" Olsen (9 Aug 1998 – June 16, 1999)
 Knut Arild Løberg (17 June 1999 – Dec 31, 1999)
 Tom Nordlie (1 Jan 2000 – Dec 31, 2000)
 Kjetil Rekdal (1 Jan 2001 – Aug 20, 2006)
 Petter Myhre (21 Aug 2006 – July 27, 2007)
 Harald Aabrekk (28 July 2007 – Dec 31, 2007)

 Martin Andresen (2008 – Dec 31, 2012)
 Kjetil Rekdal (8 Jan 2013– 31 Dec 2016) 
 Ronny Deila (1 Jan 2017 – 6 Jan 2020)
 Dag-Eilev Fagermo (31 Jan 2020 – )

See also
 Vålerenga Ishockey
 Vålerenga Trolls

References

 Nome, Petter. Vi er Vål'enga. Oslo: Cappelen, 1997. .

External links

  
 Vålerenga Fotball På Nett 
 Klanen, official Vålerenga supporters club 

 
Association football clubs established in 1913
Eliteserien clubs
1913 establishments in Norway
Football clubs in Oslo